The NSWRL President Cup is a semi-professional, open-aged rugby league football competition played in New South Wales. The competition is administered by the New South Wales Rugby League (NSWRL). The competition includes teams from domestic rugby league clubs (mainly from the Illawarra District), Ron Massey Cup, Sydney Shield and Canterbury Cup clubs.

History 
The Presidents Cup is a Rugby League trophy which has been awarded in many competitions, governed by New South Wales Rugby League (NSWRL). It was 1910 when Sir James Joynton Smith, the newly-appointed President of the NSWRL, donated the trophy. Joynton Smith was the Lord Mayor of Sydney and earned a knighthood for his philanthropic work. A shrewd businessman, he was a key figure in the game up until his death in 1943.

Initially the Presidents Cup was awarded in the Under 21 competition between representative teams from each district’s junior league. It ran in this format until the mid 1990s.

As the top tier premiership expanded in the 1980s, and the Under 23s competition was scrapped, the Under 21s competition was expanded. In 1997, with a split competition, the ARL scrapped reserve grade, and the Under 21s served as curtain raisers to first grade games. The following year, the first year of the NRL, the Under 21s competition was scrapped, junior competitions were rationalised, and reserve grade was reintroduced under different names, including Premier League and First Division. The Presidents Cup trophy was awarded to the winner of this competition. In 2008, the centenary of rugby league in Australia, this division was renamed as the NSW Cup competition. The Presidents Cup trophy was awarded for the first two years in this grade, then a new trophy was awarded for the 2010 competition.

Historic Presidents Cup Competitions

Modern Presidents Cup 
After the Metropolitan Cup/Bundaberg Rum Cup/Jim Beam Cup/Ron Massey Cup took over the mantle of the Third Grade Championship. This was until, after the NSWRL-CRL merger in 2020, the champions of the Illawarra Rugby League and Newcastle Rugby League began to playoff against the Ron Massey Cup champions for the prestigious Presidents Cup. The Peter McDonald Premiership became the fourth feeder league to this Champions League-style tournament in 2022 following the Group 10-Group 11 merger.

2020 Format 
In 2020, the competition returned in light of NSWRL competitions being cancelled due to the COVID-19 crisis. These cancelled competitions include the NSW Cup, Ron Massey Cup and the Newcastle Rugby League competition. Nine teams competed in the returning edition; North Sydney Bears, Dubbo CYMS, Thirroul Butchers, Western Suburbs Red Devils, Western Rams, Hills District Bulls, Wentworthville Magpies, Maitland Pumpkin Pickers and Glebe-Burwood Wolves. The competition was played over nine rounds with two weeks of finals including the Grand Final on 27-Sep at Bankwest Stadium, Parramatta. Maitland Pickers won the Grand Final 17-16 over Glebe-Burwood Wolves, capturing the Premiership as well as the minor premiership for topping the regular season ladder. Hooker Alex Langbridge was named both the player of the Grand Final and of the season as a whole.

2021-present: Statewide Third Grade 
From 2021, the competition will be the statewide third grade competition, running as an end of season competition for the premiers of Illawarra Rugby League, Newcastle Rugby League, Peter McDonald Premiership and Ron Massey Cup. The Peter McDonald Premiership joined the other three leagues as third-tier competitions through the merger of the fourth tier Group 10 and Group 11 competitions. After 2021 saw the competition cancelled due to COVID, 2022 saw a return to the competition, with Maitland Pickers defending their 2020 title. On 25 September 2022, they defeated The Hills Bulls 36-12. Maitland Pickers Five-Eighth Chad O'Donnell was named player of the match.

Modern Presidents Cup Premiers

Conference Winners

Central Conference

Northern Conference

Southern Conference

Western Conference

See also
 Pre-season Cup
 Canterbury Cup NSW
 Ron Massey Cup
 Sydney Shield
 NSW Challenge Cup
 Rugby League Competitions in Australia

References

Recurring sporting events established in 1910
1910 establishments in Australia
Sports leagues established in 1910
Rugby league in Sydney
Rugby league competitions in New South Wales
National cup competitions